Douglas Keith Nussmeier (born December 11, 1970) is an American football coach and former quarterback who is the current quarterbacks coach for the Los Angeles Chargers of the National Football League (NFL). He previously served as an assistant coach at Florida, Michigan, Alabama, Washington, Fresno State and Michigan State. Nussmeier has also previously served as quarterbacks coach for the St. Louis Rams, Ottawa Renegades and BC Lions.

Early years
Born in Portland, Oregon, Nussmeier is a 1989 graduate of Lakeridge High School in Lake Oswego, a suburb south of Portland. He did not start at quarterback for the Pacers football team until his senior season.

Playing career

College
Though he followed Pac-10 quarterbacks Erik Wilhelm and Jason Palumbis at Lakeridge, the left-handed Nussmeier was not recruited by the  He played college football at Idaho under John L. Smith, and won the 1993 Walter Payton Award, presented annually to the Division I-AA player of the year. That year, Nussmeier threw a school-record 33 touchdown passes, leading the Vandals to an  record and the national  During his final two seasons at Idaho (1992–93), the offensive coordinator was Scott Linehan, later an NFL offensive coordinator and head coach. Linehan was the Vandals' starting quarterback for three seasons (1984–86).  A four-year starter at quarterback, Nussmeier succeeded John Friesz, another Walter Payton Award winner in 1989, Nussmeier's redshirt season.

As a fifth-year senior in 1993, Nussmeier had a QB rating of 172.2 - completing 185-of-304 throws (.609) for 2,960 yards and a school-record 33 touchdowns. Nussmeier still ranks among the NCAA I-AA all-time leaders in passing (No. 9 with 10,824 career yards) and total offense (No. 10 at 309.1 yards per game). He is one of only five quarterbacks in NCAA history to throw for at least 10,000 yards and rush for 1,000 yards (1,230), joining Alcorn State's Steve McNair (1991–94), Central Florida's Daunte Culpepper (1996–98), Central Michigan's Dan LeFevour (2006–09), and Nevada's Colin Kaepernick (2007–10). Nussmeier set Vandal career records for passing yards, TD passes (91), passing efficiency (175.2), completion percentage (.609, 746-1,225) and total offense (12,054 yards; 308.4 yards per game).

Nussmeier earned his bachelor's degree in business from the University of Idaho in 1994.

National Football League
Nussmeier was selected by the Saints in the fourth round of the 1994 NFL Draft, 116th overall. He was the fourth quarterback selected, behind first round selections Heath Shuler and Trent Dilfer.

Nussmeier was a reserve quarterback in the NFL for five seasons in the mid-1990s, spending four years with the New Orleans Saints (1994–97) and one with the Indianapolis Colts (1998). Over his NFL career, he saw playing time in eight regular-season games, throwing for 455 yards, 1 touchdown and 4 interceptions. In 1998, Nussmeier spent part of training camp with the Denver Broncos, but was released prior to the regular season and picked up by the Colts. He is one of only 32 left-handed quarterbacks to play in the NFL.

Canadian Football League
Nussmeier finished his playing career with the BC Lions of the CFL in 2000, and stayed with the organization as the quarterbacks coach for 2001.

Coaching career

Early career
After coaching the quarterbacks for the BC Lions in 2001, he became the quarterbacks coach and de facto offensive coordinator of the Ottawa Renegades in 2002.

Michigan State
In 2003, Nussmeier was hired as the quarterbacks coach at Michigan State under his college head coach, John L. Smith. He would serve in this role for three seasons (2003-05).

St. Louis Rams
In 2006, Nussmeier was hired by the St. Louis Rams as their quarterbacks coach under head coach Scott Linehan for the St. Louis Rams for two seasons (2006–07).

Fresno State
Nussmeier was the offensive coordinator and quarterbacks coach at Fresno State for a season in 2008.

Washington
Nussmeier was hired in the same capacity at Washington in Seattle in early 2009 under new head coach Steve Sarkisian. His annual salary at UW was just under $300,000.

Alabama
In January 2012, Nussmeier became the new offensive coordinator and quarterbacks coach at Alabama in Tuscaloosa under head coach  replacing outgoing coordinator Jim McElwain, the new head coach at Colorado State. Under Nussmeier's guidance in 2012, junior quarterback A. J. McCarron set the school record for touchdowns in a season with 26. McCarron threw an additional four touchdowns in the national championship game against Notre Dame in a  victory, which allowed McCarron to set another school record for career touchdown passes.

Michigan
In 2014, Nussmeier was hired at Michigan in Ann Arbor on January 9, following the firing of offensive coordinator Al Borges.

Florida
Michigan head coach Brady Hoke was fired after that season on December 2, and Nussmeier was hired at Florida in Gainesville a few weeks later, on the staff of new head coach  In his third season with the Gators in 2017, McElwain was fired in late October and Nussmeier was let go a month later.

Dallas Cowboys
On February 14, 2018, Nussmeier was hired by the Dallas Cowboys as their tight ends coach under head coach Jason Garrett and offensive coordinator Scott Linehan; all three are former quarterbacks, as is then-quarterbacks coach Jon Kitna. In 2020, Nussmeier was retained by the Cowboys under new head coach Mike McCarthy, being promoted to quarterbacks coach.

References

External links

 Dallas Cowboys bio 
 Alabama Crimson Tide bio 
 Idaho Vandals Hall of Fame bio

1970 births
Living people
American people of German descent
American football quarterbacks
Canadian football quarterbacks
American players of Canadian football
Alabama Crimson Tide football coaches
BC Lions coaches
BC Lions players
Dallas Cowboys coaches
Florida Gators football coaches
Fresno State Bulldogs football coaches
Idaho Vandals football players
Indianapolis Colts players
Lakeridge High School alumni
Michigan State Spartans football coaches
Michigan Wolverines football coaches
New Orleans Saints players
Ottawa Renegades coaches
Players of American football from Oregon
Rhein Fire players
Sportspeople from Lake Oswego, Oregon
Sportspeople from Portland, Oregon
St. Louis Rams coaches
Walter Payton Award winners
Washington Huskies football coaches